The 1979 Delaware Fightin' Blue Hens football team represented the University of Delaware as an independent during the 1979 NCAA Division II football season. They were led by 14th year head coach Tubby Raymond and played their home games at Delaware Stadium in Newark, Delaware.

The team was named the Lambert Cup Eastern Champions for being the best NCAA Division II football team in the East, and the team also earned Eastern College Athletic Conference Team of the Year honors. Delaware led Division II football in attendance, with 19,644 attendees per regular season home game.

Schedule

Post-season honors
After the season, senior quarterback Scott Brunner earned American Football Coaches Association first-team All-America honors, Associated Press (AP) second-team All-America honors, All-Eastern Collegiate Athletic Conference (ECAC) Player of the Year honors, and first-team All-ECAC honors. Guard Herb Beck earned AP first-team All-America honors. Fullback Bo Dennis, tight end Jaime Young, center Mike Donnalley, linebacker Mike Wisniewski, cornerback Vince Hyland, and safety Guy Ramsey earned AP honorable mention All-America honors. Dennis, Young, Beck, Donnalley, Wisniewski, Hyland, Ramsey, and kicker Brandt Kennedy earned first-team All-East (ECAC) honors.

References

Delaware
Delaware Fightin' Blue Hens football seasons
NCAA Division II Football Champions
Delaware Fightin' Blue Hens football